Isaac Marston (January 2, 1839 – October 31, 1891) was an American jurist and politician.

Born in Poyntzpass, County Armagh, Ireland, Marston emigrated to the United States and worked on a farm in Pontiac, Michigan with an uncle. In 1861, he graduated from University of Michigan Law School and practiced law in Ithaca, Michigan. In 1872, Marston served in the Michigan House of Representatives. Then, in 1874, Marston served as Michigan Attorney General. From 1875 to 1883, Marston served on the Michigan Supreme Court and was chief justice. He then practiced law in Detroit, Michigan. Marston died at his Riverside Farm near Bay City, Michigan.

Notes

1839 births
1891 deaths
Irish emigrants to the United States (before 1923)
People from County Armagh
Politicians from Bay City, Michigan
University of Michigan Law School alumni
Michigan lawyers
Michigan Attorneys General
Chief Justices of the Michigan Supreme Court
Members of the Michigan House of Representatives
People from Pontiac, Michigan
People from Ithaca, Michigan
19th-century American politicians
19th-century American judges
19th-century American lawyers
Justices of the Michigan Supreme Court